Ernesto Cortázar (May 2, 1940August 2, 2004) was a Mexican composer, arranger, and pianist, born in Mexico City and who died in Tampico, Tamaulipas.

At the age of 13, Ernesto Cortázar lost his parents in a car accident. He finished his musical studies, and at age 17, began his work as a film musician. In 1958, he won the Best Background Music Award for a Latin American film at the International Festival of Cartagena (Colombia), with the melody Rio de Sueños.

He scored more than 500 films and managed to become the #1 artist of mp3.com during the years 1999 and 2001, achieving more than 14 million downloads at that time.

After living in Los Angeles, California for most of his adult life, he returned to Mexico, settling in Tampico, where he died, the victim of cancer in 2004.

References

Mexican composers
Mexican pianists
Mexican film score composers
Male film score composers
1940 births
2004 deaths
20th-century pianists